Shashi Caan a design futurist, educator and author, her dedication to furthering human betterment through and by design is reflected in her 25-year design career.

Biography
Shashi Caan was educated at the Edinburgh College of Art, Scotland, BFA(Hons), and later at Pratt Institute, New York City, two master’s degrees, the first in Industrial Design and the second in Architecture.

Professional practice
Shashi Caan is the founding partner of THE COLLECTIVE US/THE SC COLLECTIVE UK which provides architecture, interior, workplace, and product design solutions focusing on supporting people both pragmatically and qualitatively.
In 2013, Shashi Caan also founded GloW-DESIGN (Globally We Design), a platform whose purpose is to generate and disseminate new design thinking, practice and processes to tackle the ever more pressing and contemporary problems facing humanity at large. GloW-DESIGN is composed by five different programs:

Next-GenNarrative (NGN) creative leadership Think-Tank;
ReDesignEd Educators Forum;
World Youth Designer Program: include the World Youth Designer and World Youth Designer Forum (WYD + WYDF);
CoDesign from concept to reality – Design projects co-designed collaboratively in live time across the world;
GloW-Design expo – addressing design and market.

In 2018, The GloW-DESIGN Educators Forum 2018 formulated the Universal Design Educators Charter as part of the ReDesignEd program. The Charter was created to provide a framework and filter through which design education and curricula are assessed, valued, and contextualized globally and collectively. The Charter is a collection of seven articles, six of them affirming a common global aspiration of achievement for all designers, and the last one a disclaimer. The essays address the areas of:

Culture change,
Knowledge and skills (education),
Sustainability,
Technology,
Acknowledgement (certification) and
Responsibility.

The Universal Educational Charter recognizes that design impacts all aspects of life, therefore, it has to serve the endeavor for the betterment of human experience, quality of life, well-being, and happiness.

The Universal Educational Charter recognizes that design impacts all aspects of life; therefore, it has to serve the endeavor for the betterment of human experience, quality of life, well-being, and happiness.

Since the 1980s, Shashi Caan has held numerous teaching engagements at such institutions as Parson the New School for Design, in New York. From 2002-2007, Professor Caan was the Chair of the Interiors Program at Parsons  and she served as the Faculty Trustee on the Board of Trustees for the New York School of Interior Design.

Caan is the current CEO of the International Federation of Interior Architects/Designers (IFI), for which she was President from 2009 to 2014.

During her presidency, in 2011, she conceived and helped to inaugurate the IFI Interiors Declaration . This Declaration, initiated with input from 88 world counties. The Interiors Declaration has been adopted at city government level by some 124 world cities and two nations: the Philippines and Nigeria.

She is the author of the book Rethinking Design and Interiors: Human Beings in the Built Environment, (Laurence King publisher, 2011) which has also been translated into Chinese.
 
Formerly she was Senior Designer and Associate with Gensler  and then Design Director and Associate Partner with Skidmore, Owings and Merrill .

Education

Edinburgh College of Art, University of Edinburgh, Scotland BFA(Hons);
Pratt Institute (MSArch), 1992;
Pratt Institute (MID – Master of Industrial Design);
Ph.D.(h.c.) from the New York School of Interior Design, 2010;

Career as Designer

Senior Designer at Gensler;
Design Director and Associate Partner at Skidmore, Owings and Merrill;
Founder and Principal, THE COLLECTIVE (2002–present);
Chair of Interior Design at Parsons School of Design (2002-2007);
President of the International Federation of Interior Architects/Designers (IFI) (2009-2014);
CEO of the International Federation of Interior Architects/Designers (IFI) (2017 to present);
Founder of GloW-DESIGN (2013–present);

Recognition

2013 JDP Design Ambassador to Japan;
2012 Golden Seat Architectural Master Award of China;
2006 International Facility Member Association (IFMA) Educator of the Year;
2004 U.S. Designer of the Year Contract Magazine, (Contract Magazine, January 2004);

Fellowships

Fellow of IFI, 2014;
Fellow the Royal Society for the Encouragement of the Arts, Manufactures and Commerce, 2014
Honorary Fellow American Society of Interior Designers, 2015;
Honorary Fellow British Institute of Interior Design, 2014;
Honorary Fellow Design Institute of Australia, 2013; 
Fellow Consejo Iberoamericano de Diseñadores de Interiores, 2013;

Independent Research and Exhibitions
Spatial Color 
Live Lab Experiment and Installation: Bridging the Art and Science of Color, Architectural Digest Home Show, New York, NY. Televised on the Today Show, March 2006
Curator, "Fifty Shades of Green" 2000
Sustainable Materials & Product Exhibit, Archeworks, Chicago, IL
Curator, "Virtual Color" 1997 
3D Color Exhibit, New York School of Interior Design, New York, NY. Televised on Channel 4 News, 1997
Co-Curator, "Glamorous Green" 1997
Environmental Product and Materials, AIA Interiors Committee & Material ConneXions, New York, NY
Co-Curator, "Surfaces" 1996
Innovation in Architectural Materials, AIA Interiors Committee, NY, NY
Research Grant (Graduate Architecture Research) 1991
Pittsburgh Corning Glass Corporation: Light/Color in Architecture

Juries and lectures

Shashi Caan has delivered dozens of keynotes and public lectures, along with serving on many of international design juries. Most recent juries include:

The Rigg Design Prize Jury, Melbourne, Australia (2018)
INDE Awards Asia Jury, Singapore (2018)
DFA Awards, Hong Kong Jury 2018.

Author / Publications

Rethinking Design and Interiors: Human Being in the Built Environment, Laurence King Publishing 2011
Over the last decade she has written some thirty articles, essays and critiques, published both in the US and internationally.

References

American interior designers
Alumni of the Edinburgh College of Art
Pratt Institute faculty
Design educators
Living people
American women interior designers
Year of birth missing (living people)
American women academics
21st-century American women